WKVS (103.3 FM) is a radio station licensed to Lenoir, North Carolina, United States.  The station is currently owned by Foothills Radio Group, LLC. The station currently carries local live programming with the "Steve Z in the Morning" morning show, "Middays with Wild Bill" and "The Drive Home with Kylee". WKVS is also the home of the popular Saturday morning sports talk show "The Scoreboard" with David Jones, Jeff Link and Justin Carlton. WKVS broadcasts high school football games mainly in Caldwell, Burke and Catawba Counties.

References

External links

KVS
Country radio stations in the United States